Cockburn may refer to:

People
Cockburn (surname), a surname of Scottish origin

Places

Australia 
City of Cockburn, Local Government Area of Western Australia, named after Admiral Sir George Cockburn
Electoral district of Cockburn, seat in the Western Australian parliament
Cockburn, South Australia, a locality on the NSW-SA state border
Cockburn River, tributary of the Namoi River, NSW
Cockburn Central, Western Australia, in the southern suburbs of Perth

Canada 
Cockburn Island (Ontario), a  island in Lake Huron
Cape Cockburn (Nunavut), a cape at the southern end of Bathurst Island in Nunavut
Cockburn River (Nunavut), a river in north-central Baffin Island in Nunavut

Caribbean 
Cockburn Gardens, a district in the eastern part of Kingston, Jamaica
Cockburn Harbour, a settlement in the Turks and Caicos Islands
Cockburn Town, the capital city of the Turks and Caicos Islands
Cockburn Town, Bahamas on San Salvador Island in the Bahamas, named after Sir Francis Cockburn

Other places
Cockburn Island (Antarctica)
Cockburn Island (Polynesia), the name given by the British to Fangataufa atoll in French Polynesia
Cockburn School, a secondary school in Leeds, West Yorkshire, England
Cockburn Channel, a 64 km long sea channel in Tierra del Fuego

Other uses
Cockburn Collection, a collection of tartan patterns
Cockburn's Port, a brand of port wine produced by Symington Family Estates

See also
Coburn (disambiguation), pronounced the same as Cockburn